Safet Alic (born 4 February 1999) is a Swiss football midfielder of Bosnia and Herzegovina origin who plays for Biel-Bienne.

Club career
Alic made his professional debut for Neuchâtel Xamax in a 3-0 Swiss Super League loss to FC Basel on 24 August 2019. He joined Yverdon Sport in August 2020.

References

External links

SFL Profile
Xamax Profile

1999 births
Footballers from Sarajevo
Swiss people of Bosnia and Herzegovina descent
Living people
Association football midfielders
Swiss men's footballers
Neuchâtel Xamax FCS players
FC Bavois players
Yverdon-Sport FC players
FC Biel-Bienne players
Swiss Super League players
Swiss Challenge League players
Swiss Promotion League players